The 2006 AFC Challenge Cup was held between 1 and 16 April 2006 in Bangladesh. Sixteen teams were split into four groups, the top two in each group qualifying for the quarterfinals, and from then on a straight knockout contest. There was no qualification stage. The cup winner was Tajikistan. The fair play award was won by Sri Lanka and Tajikistani Ibrahim Rabimov won the most valuable player award.

Selection of teams
The AFC classed seventeen nations as emerging associations, which need time to develop their football. They were selected in August 2005 to take part. Laos, Mongolia, and Timor-Leste were initially selected to participate, but were later replaced by Bangladesh and India of the developing associations class, reducing the number of participating teams to sixteen.

Hosts and stadia
The AFC decided at its annual meeting, that Bangladesh would host the opening ceremony and that Nepal would host the final unless Bangladesh makes it into the last two, in which case it would be held in Dhaka, its capital. It was originally planned that the teams in Groups A and B would play their games in Nepal and that teams in Groups C and D would play in Bangladesh, but due to the political unrest that shook Nepal, it was decided that only Bangladesh would host the tournament. The Challenge Cup was originally scheduled to take place between 26 March to 9 April 2006 but was changed to avoid clashes with Bangladesh's Independence Day on 26 March. The two stadia that were selected to be used during this tournament were: the Bangabandhu Stadium in Dhaka and the MA Aziz Stadium in Chittagong. However, the Bangladesh Army Stadium in Dhaka was later used to make-up the matches that were abandoned due to heavy rain.

Venues

Teams
Some teams did not take part with their 'main' national squad, as noted below:

India decided to field their under-20 team in preparation for the AFC Youth Championship they were later hosting.
Kyrgyzstan took part with a young squad, made up mostly of players from their under-20 team which had qualified for the AFC Youth Championship.

Squads

Group stage
All times are Bangladesh Standard Time (BST) – UTC+6

Tie-breaking criteria
Where two or more teams end the group stage with the same number of points, their ranking is determined by the following criteria:
 points earned in the matches between the teams concerned;
 goal difference in the matches between the teams concerned;
 number of goals scored in the group matches between the teams concerned;
 goal difference in all group matches;
 number of goals scored in all group matches;
 kicks from the penalty mark (if only two teams are level and they are both on the field of play);
 fewer yellow and red cards received in the group matches;
 drawing of lots by the organising committee.

Group A

Group B

Group C

Group D

Knockout stage

Quarter-finals

Semi-finals

Final

Winner

Awards

Goalscorers

8 goals
 Fahed Attal

5 goals
 Pradeep Maharjan

4 goals
 Dzhomikhon Mukhidinov
 Yusuf Rabiev

3 goals
 Vimal Pariyar
 Khurshed Makhmudov

2 goals
 Hafizullah Qadami
 Alfaz Ahmed
 Zahid Hasan Ameli
 Mohamed Abdul Hossain
 Chuang Wei-lun
 Chan Kin Seng
 Basanta Thapa
 Muhammad Essa
 Ziyad Al-Kord
 Ibrahim Al-Sweirki
 Ahmed Keshkesh
 Alvin Valeroso
 Kasun Jayasuriya
 Mohamed Izzadeen
 Numonjon Hakimov
 Ibrahim Rabimov

1 goal
 Sayed Maqsood
 Mahadi Tapu
 Adie Arsham Salleh
 Riwandi Wahit
 Sok Buntheang
 Keo Kosal
 Chan Rithy
 Kouch Sokumpheak
 Liang Chien-wei
 Roman Ablakimov
 Ruslan Djamshidov
 Azamat Ishenbaev
 Andrey Krasnov
 Tashi Tsering
 Adeel Ahmed
 Ismail Al-Amour
 Francisco Atura
 Sanjaya Pradeep Arachchige
 Chandradasa Karunaratne
 Jeewantha Dhammika Ratnayaka
 Odil Irgashev
 Rustam Khojaev
 Shujoat Nematov

Notes

References

External links
Official site of the AFC Challenge Cup Bangladesh 2006
AFC Challenge Cup 2006 at RSSSF
AFC Challenge Cup 2006 at FutbolPlanet.de

 
AFC Challenge Cup
Challenge Cup
AFC Challenge Cup
International association football competitions hosted by Bangladesh